Ramata Diakité (born September 17, 1991) is a Malian basketball player for ASPTT Arras and the Malian national team.

She participated at the 2017 Women's Afrobasket.

References

1991 births
Living people
Malian expatriate basketball people in France
Malian expatriate basketball people in Switzerland
Malian women's basketball players
Power forwards (basketball)
21st-century Malian people